The Nicosia Cinema Bombing took place on 24 May 1955. A cinema in Nicosia was bombed by the EOKA as part of an unsuccessful attempt to assassinate British governor Sir Robert Armitage. The bomb went off a few yards from where Armitage had been sitting a few minutes earlier; however by the time of the explosion most of the cinema had been vacated. The cinema had been screening the movie Forbidden Cargo on Empire Day as a fundraiser for the British Legion Fund.

References

1955 in film
Explosions in 1955
Attacks on cinemas
Wars involving the United Kingdom
Cyprus Emergency
Conflicts in 1955
History of Nicosia
1955 in Cyprus
20th century in Nicosia
May 1955 events in Europe
Failed assassination attempts in Europe
Building bombings in Europe